Pi Woo-jin (born 20 August 1956) is a first generation female helicopter pilot of South Korean Army previously served as President Moon Jae-in's first Minister of Patriots and Veterans Affairs of South Korea from 2017 to 2019. She is the first woman to lead this ministry.

After graduating from university in 1978, Pi worked as a teacher at a night school where she saw an ad from South Korean Army. In 1979 she was commissioned as Second Lieutenant after passing the cadet exam and training. Since 1981 she worked as a helicopter pilot after completing relevant training.

In 2002 Pi was diagnosed with breast cancer. After having a mastectomy on both breasts to avoid any discomfort in military service - even though only one was medically necessary - she returned to health and therefore army. In 2006 she was forced to be discharged for being diagnosed with disability defined by military code.

During the lawsuit to overthrow the decision and therefore be reinstated to the army, she ran as a proportional representative candidate for the New Progressive Party in the 2008 general election. She quit the party as soon as she won the legal battle since no military officer can hold party membership.

In 2009 Pi rejoined the army and lead the Department of Training and Doctrine Development at the Army Aviation School for over three months before she was discharged due to the standard retirement age for her rank.

She holds two degrees in physical education: bachelor from Cheongju University in 1978 and master's from Konkuk University in 1986.

Electoral history

Published works 
Pi's biography Female Soldiers Do Not Like Chocolates (2006)

References

External links 

 Minister of Patriots and Veterans Affairs

Konkuk University alumni
1956 births
Living people
Government ministers of South Korea
Women government ministers of South Korea
South Korean aviators
Helicopter pilots
South Korean military personnel
People from Chungju
Hongcheon Pi clan